2019 in men's road cycling is about the 2019 men's bicycle races governed by the UCI. The races are part of the UCI Road Calendar.

World Championships

The World Road Championships were held in Innsbruck, Austria, from 22 to 30 September 2019.

Grand Tours

UCI World Tour

For the 2019 season, the UCI World Tour calendar contains the same events as in 2018.

UCI tours

2.HC Category Races

1.HC Category Races

Championships

Continental Championships

National Championships

UCI Teams

UCI WorldTeams
The UCI granted a UCI WorldTour licence to the following eighteen teams:

UCI Professional Continental teams

References

 

Men's road cycling by year